Joshua Goot (born 1980 in Sydney, New South Wales) is an Australian independent fashion designer and entrepreneur. He was born in Sydney and moved to New York with his then partner, Vogue Australia fashion director Christine Centenera.

Education
Goot attended Moriah College, graduating in 1997. He began a BA in Communication (Media, Arts and Production) at the University of Technology Sydney, where he began an interest in fashion design. Goot was quoted saying, "my course had a communications focus and I became intrigued by the idea of fashion as a form of media." Goot deferred his studies after one year, choosing to travel Europe and the Middle East.

Early career
Josh Goot has no formal fashion education. His introduction to the industry came with his first label, Platform, founded in 2000 with his friend Josh Goulburn. The pair split in 2002, and Goot continued with Platform, taking the printed t-shirt line into a youth-focused, street-wear collection. The Platform became defunct in 2004.

Josh Goot
In early 2005, Goot launched his eponymous label with a capsule of unisex tailored jersey essentials in grey marl and "futuristic" silver. The collection was "made entirely from cotton jersey, from blazers and trench coats to trousers, albeit they were precisely cut and beautifully finished." "Taking the structured principles of tailoring and applying them to sportswear", his debut offering was viewed as "a new fashion hybrid... a contemporary, forward-thinking, unisex collection". In 2005, the Josh Goot debut collection won Australia’s Tiffany & Co. Designer of the Year Award at the Melbourne Fashion Festival and the Prix de Marie Claire Award for Best Up and Coming Designer.

In May 2005, Josh Goot debuted a collection at Australian Fashion Week. The collection at the Australian Fashion Week remained true to his cotton jersey concept and unisex ideals. The look evolved into a more feminine and less practical collection whilst retaining the ease and simplicity of the first. Goot’s first runway presentation introduced a new aesthetic to the Australian fashion & beauty landscape – the natural light, paired-back hair, make-up, and sense of open space would become brand ideals.The collection captured the interest of the Australian industry and consumers - bought by leading boutiques, including The Corner Shop (Sydney), Parlour X (Sydney), Marais (Melbourne) and Elle (Perth).

New York
Josh Goot pieces appeared on the cover of Women’s Wear Daily for its "marriage between traditional tailoring and the all American T".

In September 2006, Goot showed up at New York Fashion Week for the first time. His "urban athletic looks", presented at the Matthew Marks Gallery, were well received by international press & buyers. The label secured leading stockists, including Colette (Paris) and Browns Focus (London). During his time in New York, Goot’s "clean, lean lines, strong colour sense and modern attitude" emerged as defining principles. Goot continued to show his collections in New York and Sydney. With the attention and growth, he moved to London in 2008 - invited by the British Fashion Council to show at London Fashion Week.

London
The move to London saw Goot's style develop further - introducing original digital art, tailoring techniques and complex constructions. His first London show, a collection inspired by water, was noticed for a "pragmatic modernism" of "liquid prints... colour blocked jersey and graphic simplicity." The "maverick yet disciplined" digital art, developed in collaboration with Sydney-based creative Shane Sakkeus, and "precisely engineered" to each garment became a signature." In London, the collection secured leading customers in Europe, including Le Bon Marche (Paris), Maria Luisa (Paris), Liberty (department store) (London) and Matches Fashion (London).

Return to Australia
Following the Financial crisis of 2007–2008, Goot experienced a downturn in his international business and returned to Australia in 2009 to focus on his home market.The collections retained a focus on digital print and introduced a series of "innovative technological developments in textiles" developed in Goot’s Sydney studio. 

2011 saw a return to Australian Fashion Week with a collection inspired by Gerhard Richter, staged in a disused Ford Factory. Later that year, Goot signed with leading Australian department store David Jones Limited, opening the Autumn/Winter 2012 launch with a tailored tuxedo suit worn by Miranda Kerr.

Sydney and Melbourne

In 2010, Josh Goot opened his first retail store in a converted gallery space on Glenmore Road, Paddington, an inner-city suburb of Sydney.

In 2012, the label moved to Oxford Street, Sydney. Working with architect Andy McDonnell, the new retail environment introduced audio-visual elements and pristine white walls, juxtaposed with raw construction materials. A retractable roof opened to the sky above a multi-colour carpet designed by Shane Sakkeus. In 2013, Goot opened in Melbourne. The bunker-like frontage expanded to an "all-concrete space that is bold and controlled, broken only by a large glass atrium at the rear that towers above the change rooms, letting in the elements and beautiful floor-filling light".

Collaborations
Josh Goot has a long-standing relationship with Australian Wool Innovation. He has acted as an ambassador and advocate for Australian Merino Wool, incorporating Merino textile developments into his collections. In 2007, Josh Goot was one of the first Australian designers to collaborate with Target Australia in the Designers For Target initiative. "I believe in taking my ideas to a wider audience", Goot said at the media launch.

In 2010, Josh Goot collaborated with the Sydney Dance Company in Rafael Bonachella’s 6 Breaths, working with artist and designer Jonathan Zawada on a print-based, unisex identity for the production.

Australian Identity
Josh Goot has been integral to establishing Australian fashion design internationally. Goot’s collections are known for their consumer-focused "minimalist designs which boast clean lines and a clever use of textiles", with exclusive Australian production benefitting the local industry. Goot also emphasizes premium fabrics such as 100% silks with digital prints, Australian Merino wool and bonded viscose nylons to build an "investment wardrobe for the modern woman".

In 2013, Goot said, "What I wanted to do with the label was to create a modern, urban, Australian fashion brand. It was born out of these core ideals of modernity, modernism and a sense of sport, and I wanted it to capture an Australian point of view in a new way that hadn’t been expressed before." That year, Goot spoke at the Australian Financial Review’s Bespoke Summit at the Sydney Opera House of building a luxury fashion label in Australia.

Voluntary Administration
In February 2015, Josh Goot entered Voluntary Administration. Goot spoke openly of the company’s "downward spiral", citing "well-documented external factors at play within the domestic industry." The designer said in a statement: "We now need to take some time to restructure to protect the long-term interests of the brand and all involved." Goot said, "We are, I think, unique in the Australian landscape, and that doesn’t necessarily make our experience easier, but I also think that it does give us a real future, and that's what we’re going to be working to secure."

The company emerged from Administration and control returned to Goot as sole director. "The designer behind one of Australia’s most acclaimed brands announced yesterday that creditors had voted for a Deed of Company arrangement, allowing him to continue the business as an independent operator."

Awards

 2005 Winner Tiffany & Co. Young Designer of the Year Award, Melbourne
 2005 Winner Best Up and Coming Designer Prix de Marie Claire Awards, Sydney.
 2008 Finalist The Fashion Group International. Rising Star, New York.
 2009 Finalist International Mango Fashion Award, Barcelona
 2009 Winner Best Designer Prix de Marie Claire Awards, Sydney

References

Living people
Australian fashion designers
Australian Jews
1980 births
People educated at Moriah College